The Checkerboard Lounge was a blues club on the South Side of Chicago, Illinois, established in 1972 at 423 E. 43rd St. by L.C. Thurman and Buddy Guy. In 1985, Guy left the partnership and later established Buddy Guy's Legends in Chicago's South Loop neighborhood.

The Rolling Stones video and live album Live at the Checkerboard Lounge, Chicago 1981 included the Rolling Stones performing with Muddy Waters, Buddy Guy, Junior Wells, and members of Muddy Waters' band.

In 2003, the Checkerboard Lounge, in danger of closing due to structural issues with the building, moved to a newly renovated building at 5201 S. Harper Court in Hyde Park. The club experienced declining attendance and it closed its doors in 2015, after the death of L.C. Thurman.

The club hosted musical acts including Lefty Dizz, Stevie Ray Vaughan, Eric Clapton, Magic Slim, Vance Kelly, Muddy Waters, The Rolling Stones, James Cotton, Little Johnny Christian and the Chicago Playboys, Buddy Scott and the Rib Tips, Jerry Lucky Lee and the Groove Machine, and Chuck Berry.

References

Music venues in Chicago
Chicago blues
Nightclubs in Chicago